Schöll or Schoell is a German surname. Notable people with the surname include:

Adolf Schöll (1805–1882), German classical archaeologist, philologist and art historian
Rudolf Schöll (1844–1893), German classical philologist
Fritz Schöll (1850–1919), German classical philologist
Hubert Schöll (1946–1992), German footballer
William Schoell (born 1958), American writer, biographer and film historian

See also
Scholl
Schell (disambiguation)

German-language surnames